This is a list of valleys of Iceland:

 Aðaldalur
 Breiðdalur
 Fagridalur
 Flateyjardalur
 Fljótsdalur
 Fnjóskadalur
 Haukadalur
 Hjaltadalur
 Hofsárdalur
 Hrafnkelsdalur
 Hörgárdalur
 Jökuldalur
 Mosfellsdalur
 Mýrdalur
 Norðurárdalur
 Reykjadalur
 Selárdalur
 Skorradalur
 Svarfaðardalur
 Svínadalur
 Vesturárdalur
 Þjórsárdalur
 Öxnadalur

See also

References 

 
Valleys
Iceland